John Andile Mngxitama is a South African politician serving as the president of the Black First Land First party since October 2015. Formerly a member of the Economic Freedom Fighters, he served as a Member of the National Assembly of South Africa for the party from May 2014 until his expulsion in April 2015.

Political career

Mngxitama joined the Economic Freedom Fighters in its early days in 2013 and was ranked tenth on the party's national candidate list for the May 2014 general election. He was sworn in as a Member of the National Assembly on 21 May 2014 and was assigned to the Portfolio Committee on Rural Development and Land Reform in June 2014.

At the EFF's leadership conference in December 2014, Mngxitama declined the nomination to serve on the party's Central Command Team. He then became disgruntled with the party's new leadership. In February 2015, he accused the party leader Julius Malema and his deputy Floyd Shivambu of making a deal with the African National Congress to get rid of seven EFF MPs. On 13 April, Mngxitama was expelled from the EFF and lost his parliamentary membership in accordance to the terms of section 47(3)(c) of the Constitution.

In October of the same year, he formed the Black First Land First party. The party pondered contesting the 2016 municipal elections. They did not contest it. Mngxitama has been a vocal supporter of the controversial Gupta family at the centre of  state capture in South Africa. When a series of emails dubbed the Gupta Leaks came out detailing the family's corrupt relationship and involvement in manipulating South African politics, it was revealed that Mngitxama had asked the family for cash to fund Black First Land First.

The party did contest the May 2019 general election and won no representation in parliament or in the nine provincial legislatures. In July, the IEC announced the annulment of the party's registration, following an appeal by the Freedom Front Plus. The party appealed the judgement but it was upheld in November.

References

Living people
Year of birth missing (living people)
Economic Freedom Fighters politicians
Members of the National Assembly of South Africa
21st-century South African politicians